Malcolm James Roberts (31 March 1944 – 7 February 2003) was an English traditional pop music singer, who enjoyed three hit singles from 1967 to 1969 on the UK Singles Chart. He was also an actor and musical theatre star.

Actor
Born in Blackley, Manchester, England, Roberts began his career in the entertainment industry as an actor. He had a small role in the TV show Coronation Street. His work as Tony in West Side Story led to a role in the musical Maggie May at the Adelphi Theatre in 1964.

Roberts later appeared in pantomime, starring opposite Ronnie Corbett and Clodagh Rodgers in the 1971 production of Cinderella at the London Palladium. In 1982, he performed in the pantomime Robinson Crusoe, this time in Eastbourne, and in 1984 in Goldilocks & the Three Bears in Bournemouth. He also starred in a musical at the Birmingham Repertory Theatre, based on the life of Joan of Arc. It ran for several weeks. In 1996, he took part in a different theatrical show at The Café Royal in London. In this, titled Joey & Gina's Wedding, the audience became the guests at the wedding and reception and Roberts took the part of the Irish priest who was officiating at the ceremony.

Music
Robert's first single, "Time Alone Will Tell", reached number 45 in May 1967; this was followed by the hit "May I Have the Next Dream With You" in November 1968, which reached number 8 and stayed on the chart for 15 weeks. Another hit, in November 1969, was "Love is All" (written by Les Reed and Barry Mason), which reached number 12. Roberts won as a performer the IV International Music Festival in Rio de Janeiro and the song attained third place in this Festival in 1969. According to the sleeve notes of his 2001 retrospective CD collection, his recording career continued in Brazil, where he had an affectionate reception and scored many hits. On 7 December 1968, he was the special guest singer at the 1968 Malta Song Festival held at the Plaza Theatre in Sliema, Malta.

In May 1970, Roberts appeared in concerts and numerous TV shows. He was in demand worldwide and went to Las Vegas, New York, and Hong Kong. He also went to South America and did shows in Peru, Puerto Rico, Bermuda, and Brazil.

After returning to England, in 1972, Roberts, Penny Lane and Union Express went to The European Song Festival, in which groups of singers from different countries competed. This English group won the contest.

Featured guest appearances
He also appeared on American television on 6 November 1970, via The Tonight Show Starring Johnny Carson. He had previously sung on both The Morecambe and Wise Show (1969) and The Kenneth Williams Show on BBC Television.

Songwriter
Roberts also was a songwriter, collaborating with Sammy Cahn, Les Reed and Lynsey de Paul ("The Way It Goes" on de Paul's debut album Surprise), as well as writing incidental music for ITV's dramatisation of Lady Chatterley's Lover.

Eurovision
He represented Luxembourg at the Eurovision Song Contest 1985. The song, "Children, Kinder, Enfants" was written by Ralph Siegel, Bernd Meinunger and Jean-Michel Beriat, all of whom had written Eurovision entries before, Siegel and Meinunger having written the 1982 winner for West Germany. The group consisted of an international line-up of the UK's Roberts and Ireen Sheer, Dutch singer Margo (Annemieke Verdoorn), native Luxembourgian Franck Olivier, German Chris Roberts and American Diane Solomon. The song was performed mainly in French, with a counterpane sung in English and German. They received 37 points and finished in 13th place.

In 1991, Roberts attempted alone to represent the UK, with his own composition "One Love", but finished last in the A Song For Europe contest.

Death
Roberts died of a heart attack on 7 February 2003. He was buried at Remenham Cemetery near Henley-on-Thames on 20 February 2003.

Discography

Studio albums
Mr. Roberts: 1968
Malcolm: 1969
The Voice of Malcolm Roberts: 1970
Sounds Like Malcolm Roberts: 1971
Living for Life: 1973

Live albums
Live at the Talk of the Town: 1974

Compilation albums
This is Malcolm Roberts: 1980
The Best of the EMI Years: 1993
The Essential Malcolm Roberts: 2000

Posthumous releases
The Very Best of Malcolm Roberts: 2003
Rio: 2003
Lost and Found : 2021

References

External links
Guardian newspaper obituary
Malcolmrobertsfanclub.co.uk

1944 births
2003 deaths
English male singers
Traditional pop music singers
Eurovision Song Contest entrants for Luxembourg
Eurovision Song Contest entrants of 1985
Male actors from Manchester
Singers from Manchester
People from Blackley
20th-century English singers
20th-century British male singers